Middlebury is a town in New Haven County, Connecticut, United States. The population was 7,574 at the 2020 census.

History
Middlebury incorporated as a town in 1807, and named from its central position relative to Waterbury, Woodbury and Southbury.

Geography

Towns that border Middlebury are Southbury, Woodbury, Watertown, Waterbury, Naugatuck and Oxford.

Demographics

As of the census of 2000, there were 6,451 people, 2,398 households, and 1,832 families living in the town. The racial makeup of the town was 97.12% White, 0.36% African American, 0.06% Native American, 1.30% Asian, 0.03% Pacific Islander, 0.26% from other races, and 0.87% from two or more races. Hispanic or Latino of any race were 1.22% of the population.

There were 2,398 households, out of which 33.1% had children under the age of 18 living with them, 67.3% were married couples living together, 6.3% had a female householder with no husband present, and 23.6% were non-families. 20.1% of all households were made up of individuals, and 11.9% had someone living alone who was 65 years of age or older.  The average household size was 2.66 and the average family size was 3.09.

In the town, the population was spread out, with 24.5% under the age of 18, 4.2% from 18 to 24, 25.3% from 25 to 44, 29.4% from 45 to 64, and 16.5% who were 65 years of age or older.  The median age was 43 years. For every 100 females, there were 94.1 males.  For every 100 females age 18 and over, there were 91.0 males.

The median income for a household in the town was $70,469, and the median income for a family was $81,370. Males had a median income of $51,925 versus $37,104 for females. The per capita income for the town was $33,056.  About 2.3% of families and 2.7% of the population were below the poverty line, including 2.8% of those under age 18 and 3.9% of those age 65 or over.

As of July 2006, it is estimated that there are 7,132 (+10.6% from 2000) people in Middlebury.  From 2000 to 2005, the estimated median income has risen to $77,300 (+9.7%).  The estimated median home & condo value has risen to $321,100 (+61.7%).

Local media

 Waterbury Republican-American – A Waterbury-based independent daily newspaper serving Barkhamsted, Beacon Falls, Bethlehem, Bridgewater, Burlington, Canaan, Cheshire, Colebrook, Cornwall, Falls Village, Goshen, Harwinton, Kent, Litchfield, Middlebury, Morris, Naugatuck, New Hartford, New Milford, Norfolk, Oxford, Plymouth, Prospect, Roxbury, Salisbury, Seymour, Sharon, Southbury, Southington, Thomaston, Torrington, Warren, Washington, Waterbury, Watertown, Wolcott, Woodbury, Winsted
 Voices – A Southbury-based newspaper serving Southbury, Middlebury, Oxford, Seymour, Naugatuck, Woodbury, Bethlehem, New Preston, Washington, Washington Depot, Roxbury, Bridgewater, Monroe, Sandy Hook, and Newtown.
 Middlebury Bee-Intelligencer – A Middlebury-based independent newspaper.

Notable people

 William Hawkins Abbott (1819–1901), born in Middlebury, pioneering petroleum refiner and businessman
 Shane Bannon (1989–present), Former NFL Running Back
 Mike Borkowski (1973–present), professional race car driver
 Naum Gabo (1890–1977), world-famous modernist sculptor, the founder of Constructivism in Moscow in 1919, lived in Middlebury beginning in 1953
 Grant Goodeve (1976–present), actor 
 A. W. Haydon (1906–1982), American inventor lived in Middlebury from 1965 to his death in 1982
 John G. Rowland (2006–present), former Connecticut Governor who resigned and pleaded guilty in federal court to a one-count with conspiracy to commit honest services mail fraud and tax fraud
 Katie Stevens (1992–present), American Idol contestant

Culture and notable features
Josiah Bronson House, built in 1738 and listed on the National Register of Historic Places in 1982
Quassy Amusement Park, (1908–present), one of the nation's oldest amusement parks in continuous operation

Pictures

References

External links 

 
Towns in New Haven County, Connecticut
Towns in the New York metropolitan area
Towns in Connecticut